Samuel Joseph Fuenn (15 October 1818 – 11 January 1891), also known as Rashi Fuenn and Rashif, was a Lithuanian Hebrew writer, scholar, printer, and editor. He was a leading figure of the eastern European Haskalah, and an early member of Ḥovevei Zion.

Biography
Fuenn was born in Vilna, Russian Empire, the son of merchant and Torah scholar Yitsḥak Aizik Fuenn of Grodno. Though he received a traditional religious education until the age of 17, he also acquired an extensive general knowledge of German literature and other secular subjects, and became proficient in Russian, French, Latin, Polish, and English. He afterwards joined Vilna's circle of young maskilim.

In 1848 the government appointed him teacher of Hebrew and Jewish history in the newly founded rabbinical school of Vilna. Fuenn filled this position with great distinction till 1856, when he resigned. The government then appointed him superintendent of the Jewish public schools in the district of Vilna, in which he introduced instruction in secular studies and modern languages. Since Fuenn (Russian финѣ) was employed in the Russian civil service, there was a special feature for him as a Jew, he had to legally sign in Russian according to the applicable Russian laws. Excerpt from the text of the law § 6 The Jew of the Russian Empire in translation: "The use of the Jewish language is not permitted in legal transactions. However, Hebrew home wills are permissible. If a Jew who does not speak any language other than Jewish, a document written or signed in Hebrew must be accompanied by a translation and the signature duly notarized.

He was a prolific writer, devoting his activity mainly to the fields of history and literature. With Eliezer Lipman Hurwitz he edited the short-lived Hebrew periodical Pirḥe tzafon ('Northern Flowers', 1841–43), a review of history, literature, and exegesis. For twenty-one years (1860–81), he directed the paper Ha-Karmel ('The Carmel'; at first a weekly, but from 1871 a monthly), devoted to Hebrew literature and Jewish life, with supplements in Russian and German. The paper contained many academic articles by the leading Jewish scholars of Europe, besides numerous contributions from Fuenn's own pen, including a serialized autobiography entitled Dor ve-dorshav. He opened a new Hebrew printing press in Vilna in 1863.

Besides his scholarly work, Fuenn owned some property in Vilna, including a bathhouse on Zarechye Street. He took an active part in the administration of the city and in its charitable institutions, and was for many years an alderman. In acknowledgment of his services the government awarded him two medals. He also presided over the third Ḥovevei Zion conference in Vilna, at which he, Samuel Mohilever, and Asher Ginzberg were chosen to direct the affairs of the delegate societies.

Fuenn died in Vilna on 11 January 1891. He bequeathed his entire estate to his son, Dr. Benjamin Fuenn, his daughter having converted to Catholicism some years earlier.

Personal life
Fuenn was married off by his parents at a young age. His first wife died in 1845 while their daughter was still a baby, and his second wife died in the 1848 cholera pandemic, shortly after giving birth to their son Benjamin. He married a third wife in 1851.

His niece was the Labour Zionist politician Manya Shochat.

Work

Publications

  Two lectures (one delivered by the author; the other translated from German).
  Chronology of Biblical history.
  A Russian language textbook.
  A history of the Jews and Jewish literature from the destruction of the Temple to 1170.
  A history of the Jews of Vilna, with an introduction by Mattityahu Strashun.
  A history of the Jews and their literature, in two volumes (the first dealing with the period extending from the banishment of Jehoiachin to the death of Alexander the Great; the second from Alexander's death to the installation of Simon Maccabeus as high priest and prince).
  Selected letters of Hebrew stylists from Ḥasdai ibn Shaprut to modern times.
  A fictional narrative based on people from the time of the Geonim, translated a German work of the same name by Lehmann.
  Hebrew translation of Moses Mendelssohn's Die Sache Gottes.
  Hebrew adaptation of Lehmann's Graf und Jude.
  Russian laws relating to conscription.
  A Hebrew translation of a German novel by Philippson.
  A Hungarian village tale by Hurwitz, translated from German into Hebrew.
 
  Biographies of notable Jews of Crimea and Turkey in the 14th–15th centuries.
  Essay on the value and significance of the Hebrew language and literature in the development of culture among Russian Jews.
  Hebrew adaptation of Honigmann's Die Erbschaft.
  A Hebrew and Aramaic dictionary giving Russian and German equivalents for the words of the Bible, Mishnah, and Midrashim.
  Biographical lexicon of notable Jews.

Unpublished work
Fuenn left in manuscript form a treatise on Jewish law entitled Darkhei Hashem ('The Paths of God'), written as a response to Alexander McCaul anti-Jewish work The Old Paths. Other unpublished works included Ha-moreh ba-emek ('The Teacher in the Valley'), a commentary on Maimonides' Moreh nevukhim; Mishna berurah ('Clarified Teaching') and Ḥokhmat ḥakhamim ('Wisdom of the Sages'), commentaries on the Mishnah; Ha-Torah veha-zeman ('The Torah and Time'), on the evolution of laws and regulations; Sum sekhel, glosses on the Bible; Pirḥe Levanon ('Flowers of Lebanon'), a collection of verses; and Bein ha-perakim ('Between the Chapters'), a commentary on Pirkei de-Rabbi Eliezer.

External links

 Works by Fuenn at the

Notes

References
 

1818 births
1891 deaths
19th-century lexicographers
19th-century Lithuanian writers
19th-century printers
19th-century historians from the Russian Empire
19th-century male writers from the Russian Empire
Book publishers (people)
Educators from the Russian Empire
Hebrew-language writers
Hovevei Zion
Jewish educators
Jewish historians
Jewish lexicographers
Jewish non-fiction writers
Jewish scholars
Jewish translators
Jewish writers from the Russian Empire
Lexicographers from the Russian Empire
Literary historians from the Russian Empire
Lithuanian Jews
Lithuanian lexicographers
Lithuanian literary historians
Russian magazine editors
People from Vilna Governorate
People of the Haskalah
Translators from German
Translators to Hebrew
Writers from Vilnius
German–Hebrew translators